Sikhism in Scotland includes all aspects of Sikh life and Sikhism in Scotland. Sikhs have been present in Scotland for over a century, with the first documented Sikh, Maharaja Daleep Singh, arriving in Perthshire in 1855. The next wave of migration was in early-to-mid 1920s when prominent Sikhs of the Bhat/Bhatra community established themselves in Glasgow and Edinburgh. However, the bulk of Sikhs in Scotland come from families who immigrated during the late 20th century. In Scotland Sikhs represent 0.2% of the population (9,055).

History
The first documented Sikh in Scotland was Maharajah Duleep Singh, who moved to Scotland in 1854, taking up residence at the Grandtully estate in Perthshire. According to the Scottish Sikh Association, the first Sikhs settled in Glasgow in the early 1920s with the first Gurdwara established in South Portland Street. However, the bulk of Sikhs in Scotland come from families who immigrated during the late 20th century.

21st century
According to the 2011 Census, 0.2% of Scotland's population identifies Sikhism as their religion. Glasgow is the area with the most significant Sikh population in the country. Of the seven Gurdwaras in Scotland, four are in Glasgow, one in Edinburgh, one in Dundee and one in Irvine.
Plans are also in place to open a Gurdwara in Aberdeen.

Tartan
Scottish Sikhs have their own tartan, and can be seen wearing kilts made from the material.

Gurdwaras in Scotland

Guru Nanak Gurdwara, Dundee
Guru Nanak Gurdwara, Edinburgh
Guru Nanak Gurdwara, Glasgow (West End)
Central Gurdwara Singh Sabha, Glasgow (Central)
Shri Guru Tegh Bahadur Gurdwara, Glasgow (South Side)
Gurdwara Guru Granth Sahib Sikh Sabha, Glasgow (South Side)
Guru Nanak Gurdwara Irvine, Irvine

Notable Scottish Sikhs
Pam Gosal - Member of Scottish Parliament for West Scotland
Hardeep Singh Kohli - Actor, comedian, presenter
Sanjeev Kohli - Actor, comedian, presenter
Tigerstyle - Music band of brothers Raj Singh and Pablo Singh
Tony Singh - Chef

See also
Religion in Scotland
Sikhism in the United Kingdom
List of British Sikhs
Sikhism by country
 Demographics of Scotland
 Asian-Scots
 New Scots

References

External links
Sikhs in Scotland
Glasgow Gurdwara
Central Gurdwara 
Edinburgh Gurdwara

 
Immigration to Scotland